The FN Browning M1900 is a single action, semi-automatic pistol designed c. 1896 by John Browning for Fabrique Nationale de Herstal (FN) and produced in Belgium at the turn of the 20th century. It was the first production handgun to use a slide.

History

The design was presented to arms manufacturer FN Herstal in 1898, with production commencing the following year (then under the designation Modele 1899). In 1900, an improved design featuring primarily a shorter barrel and wider grips was introduced as the M1900. These designations were applied retroactively after FN began manufacture of other Browning pistol designs; initially the M1900 was marketed as simply the "Pistolet Browning" (Browning Pistol). Production ceased only 11 years later, with a total of about 700,000+ units having been produced.

United States President Theodore Roosevelt owned a mother of pearl-gripped Modele 1899, which he regularly kept on his person and in his bedside drawer. It now resides in the NRA Firearms Museum.

Eugen Schauman, a Finnish nationalist activist, assassinated the Governor-General Nikolay Bobrikov (the highest Russian authority in the Grand Duchy of Finland) with a Browning pistol on June 16, 1904, in Helsinki. The act was followed by spontaneous anti-Russian celebrations in the streets of Helsinki and after the 1917 independence Schauman was considered to be a national hero of Finland.

An Jung-geun,  a Korean-independence activist, assassinated the Resident-General of Korea Itō Hirobumi with this type of gun on October 26, 1909 in Harbin railway station.

Fanny Kaplan, Socialist-Revolutionary, use also a FN M1900 in her attempted assassination on Lenin, On August 30, 1918.

The pistol was popular in China from its introduction through  World War II and was often copied and used as the basis for other designs. State-run arsenals produced serialized production runs for warlord militias, and local craftsmen produced one-off handmade versions.

The  is a copy of the M1900.  Specimens examined by western authorities were marked with the date of 1964.  A silenced variant was produced that featured a shortened slide to allow the threaded barrel to protrude far enough to attach the silencer.

Ammunition
The weapon is chambered for the .32 ACP, also known as 7.65×17mm Browning SR, "SR" denotes semi-rimmed.

Users 

 
 :Bought by the Federal District police
  
 :First acquired by police before 1917, in total up to a thousand were bought. The pistol was very popular in the civilian market and among early Finnish nationalist movement Voimaliitto.  Also used by the State Railways and the Bank of Finland. 
 :Bought by police agencies
 
 :Popular sidearm with officers
 :Issued to police forces and military officers

Conflicts 
Mexican Revolution

Balkan Wars

World War I

Russian Civil War

Finnish Civil War

Warlord Era

Chaco War

Chinese Civil War

World War II

Synonyms
This model is known by several names, including:
FN M1900
FN Mle.1900
Browning M1900
Browning No.1

See also
Colt M1900
FN Model 1903

Underbarrel pistols
Bayard 1908
Jieffeco Model 1911
Semmerling XLM

References

External links
FN 1900 pistol (Infographic tech. drawing)

.32 ACP semi-automatic pistols
M1900
Semi-automatic pistols of Belgium
World War II infantry weapons of China
19th-century semi-automatic pistols